{{Infobox song
| name       = Empire State Human
| cover      = Empirestatehuman.jpg
| alt        =
| type       = single
| artist     = The Human League
| album      = Reproduction
| B-side     = "Introducing"
"You've Lost that Loving Feeling" (Dutch Release)
| released   = 12 October 1979 June 1980 (re-release)
| recorded   = Monumental Studios, Sheffield
| studio     =
| venue      =
| genre      = Electronic, new wave
| length     = 4:36
| label      = Virgin
| writer     = Philip Oakey, Martyn Ware, Ian Craig Marsh
| producer   = The Human League, Colin Thurston
| prev_title = I Don't Depend on You| prev_year  = 1979
| next_title = Only After Dark
| next_year  = 1980
| misc = 
}}
"Empire State Human" is a song by the British synthpop group The Human League. The song was written by Philip Oakey, Martyn Ware and Ian Craig Marsh. It was co-produced by The Human League and Colin Thurston, and recorded at Monumental Studios in Sheffield.

The song was the third single to be released by the original line-up of the Human League, and the first and only single from the band's 1979 debut album Reproduction. Upon its first release in October 1979, the single failed to chart. However, it was re-released in June 1980 and fared slightly better, reaching number 62 in the UK Singles Chart. For the re-release, Virgin Records included a free copy of the single "Only After Dark" with the first 15,000 copies as a sweetener.

Lyrically, "Empire State Human" is a song about becoming powerful using the analogy of size, with Oakey declaring that he wants to be "tall" a total of 60 times in 3 minutes. Uncut magazine drew a comparison with Oakey's own personal ambition:

The B-side, "Introducing", is an instrumental produced by The Human League. Oakey sang on the original recording but the vocals were not used on the released version.

The open shirted man on the cover artwork is band member Ian Craig Marsh's father.

It was used in the 2012 video game Lollipop Chainsaw'' in a minigame for the retro stage, and also featured on the game's original soundtrack.

References

External links

The Human League songs
1979 singles
1979 songs
Song recordings produced by Colin Thurston
Songs written by Martyn Ware
Songs written by Philip Oakey
Songs written by Ian Craig Marsh
Music videos directed by Russell Mulcahy
Virgin Records singles